Admiral Arthur Forbes (died 20 March 1891) was a Royal Navy officer who became Commander-in-Chief, Queenstown.

Naval career
Forbes became commanding officer of the sixth-rate HMS Calypso in July 1851, commanding officer of the frigate HMS Curacoa in May 1857 and commanding officer of the second-rate HMS Renown in November 1857. His last appointment was as Commander-in-Chief, Queenstown in November 1869 before he retired in May 1871.

References

1891 deaths
Royal Navy admirals